The 24th District of the Iowa House of Representatives in the state of Iowa.

Current elected officials
Cecil Dolecheck is the representative currently representing the district.

Past representatives
The district has previously been represented by:
 Hallie Sargisson, 1971–1973
 Edgar H. Holden, 1973–1975
 Herbert C. Hinkhouse, 1975–1981
 Victor Stueland, 1981–1983
 Harlan W. Van Gerpen, 1983–1985
 Jane Teaford, 1985–1993
 Donald Hanson, 1993–1997
 Willard Jenkins, 1997–2003
 Roger Thomas, 2003–2013
 Cecil Dolecheck, 2013–present

References

024